Sense and Sensibilia is a landmark 1962 work of ordinary language philosophy by J. L. Austin, Professor of Philosophy at the University of Oxford. Austin attacks sense data theories of perception, specifically those of A. J. Ayer.

The book was published posthumously having been reconstructed from Austin's manuscript notes by fellow Oxford philosopher Geoffrey Warnock. Austin's first lectures, which formed the basis for the manuscript, were delivered at Oxford in Trinity Term 1947 under the general title "Problems in Philosophy". 

The Guardian described it as: "... a philosophical classic... Mr Warnock has performed his task in a way that is quite remarkable. His brilliant editing puts everybody who is concerned with philosophical problems in his debt."

References

1962 non-fiction books
Books about perception
Philosophy books
Philosophy of language literature